Ex-patriot may be:
Ex-PATRIOT Act, 2012 American legislative bill
Rush'n Attack: Ex-Patriot, 2011 PlayStation 3 video game
A misspelling of expatriate, a person who lives abroad

See also
Patriot (disambiguation)